Bowness is a civil parish in the Borough of Allerdale in Cumbria, England.  It contains 36 listed buildings that are recorded in the National Heritage List for England.  Of these, one is listed at Grade I, the highest of the three grades, two are at Grade II*, the middle grade, and the others are at Grade II, the lowest grade.  The parish contains the village of Bowness-on-Solway, and the settlements of Port Carlisle, Glasson, Drumburgh, Easton, Fingland, Whitrigg, and Anthorn.  Because of its proximity to the Scottish border, it contains fortified houses, some of which have survived and are listed.  Hadrian's Wall passes through the parish, and a number of listed buildings are constructed in material taken from the wall.  In the early 19th century the Carlisle Canal was built, and was later replaced by the Port Carlisle Dock and Railway.  Some structures remain from this and are listed.  Otherwise, most of the listed buildings are houses and associated structures, farmhouses and farm buildings.  The other listed buildings include a medieval cross, a church, a war memorial, and a public house.


Key

Buildings

References

Citations

Sources

Lists of listed buildings in Cumbria